The National Weather Service Pittsburgh, Pennsylvania is a local office of the National Weather Service responsible for monitoring weather conditions in western Pennsylvania, east-central Ohio, northern West Virginia and Garrett County in western Maryland, encompassing 36 counties. The Pittsburgh Weather Forecast Office (WFO) is located near Pittsburgh International Airport in Moon Township, Allegheny County, Pennsylvania.

Effective November 10, 2020, the National Weather Service Baltimore/Washington will be responsible for Garrett County, Maryland, rather than the National Weather Service Pittsburgh.

First-order/climate sites

Ohio
Harry Clever Field (New Philadelphia)
Zanesville Municipal Airport
Pennsylvania
DuBois Regional Airport (Washington Township, Jefferson County)
Pittsburgh International Airport (Moon Township, Allegheny County)
West Virginia
Morgantown Municipal Airport
Wheeling Ohio County Airport

NOAA Weather Radio
The National Weather Service Pittsburgh, Pennsylvania forecast office provides programming for nine NOAA Weather Radio stations in Pennsylvania, Ohio, and West Virginia.

References

External links
 

Pittsburgh, Pennsylvania
Organizations based in Pittsburgh